Morgan Harper (born July 1, 1983) is an American attorney, community organizer, and political candidate. After working as a senior advisor at the Consumer Financial Protection Bureau, in 2020 she campaigned against incumbent Joyce Beatty to represent Ohio's 3rd congressional district, which includes Columbus, in the United States House of Representatives. Also in 2020, she founded the non-profit Columbus Stand Up. In 2022 she ran for the United States Senate to succeed Rob Portman. She lost in the Democratic Primary to congressman Tim Ryan 69-17%.

Early life and education 
Born in Columbus, Ohio on July 1, 1983, Harper lived in a foster home for nine months before being adopted by a public school teacher. Raised in Columbus, she earned a Bachelor of Arts degree at Tufts University and a Juris Doctor degree from Stanford Law School. She later earned a Master of Public Affairs from the Woodrow Wilson School of Public and International Affairs at Princeton University.

Career 
Harper worked for three years at the Consumer Financial Protection Bureau, serving as a senior advisor to director Richard Cordray under President Obama. Afterwards, she served as vice president of knowledge management and strategy for the Local Initiatives Support Corporation.

In 2020, Harper founded Columbus Stand Up. After organizing volunteers to drive voters to polls, in 2021 Columbus Stand Up began donating masks and transporting Columbus residents to get COVID-19 vaccines.

2020 congressional campaign 

On July 1, 2019, she challenged Democratic incumbent Joyce Beatty to represent Ohio's 3rd congressional district, which includes most of Columbus. Endorsed by Justice Democrats in August 2019, she was endorsed by the Sunrise Movement in December 2019 and the Working Families Party in February 2020. Harper raised $323,000 during the campaign's first quarter, with her platform focused on "universal child care, tuition-free public college, Medicare for All, reparations, affordable housing, and a Green New Deal." On April 29, 2020, it was announced that Beatty had won the primary, with Harper earning 32% of 66,000 votes.

2022 U.S. Senate election 

In August 2021, Harper declared her candidacy for 2022 United States Senate election in Ohio. Harper faced Congressman Tim Ryan and two other candidates in the Democratic primary. Her campaign ad "My Ohio Story" was released on April 4, 2022 and claimed that she has been the only candidate who always supported "Medicare for all", a "$15 minimum wage", and "supports expanding the Supreme Court." She lost to Ryan in the Democratic Primary 69-17%.

Personal life 
Harper lives in Columbus, Ohio.

Electoral history

See also 
2020 United States House of Representatives elections in Ohio

References

External links 
Morgan Harper for Senate
Morgan Harper articles at WOSU radio

1983 births
20th-century African-American people
20th-century African-American women
21st-century African-American people
21st-century African-American women
African-American women in politics
American adoptees
Living people
Ohio Democrats
People from Columbus, Ohio
Politicians from Columbus, Ohio
Tufts University alumni
Candidates in the 2022 United States Senate elections